Currams is a surname of Irish origin. Notable people with the surname include:

 Dan Currams (born 1987), Irish hurler
 Liam Currams (born 1961), Irish hurler

Surnames of Irish origin